Johann Friedrich Theodor Müller (31 March 1822 – 21 May 1897), better known as Fritz Müller, and also as Müller-Desterro, was a German biologist who emigrated to southern Brazil, where he lived in and near the German community of Blumenau, Santa Catarina. There he studied the natural history of the Atlantic forest south of São Paulo, and was an early advocate of Darwinism. He lived in Brazil for the rest of his life. Müllerian mimicry is named after him.

Life 
Müller was born in the village of Windischholzhausen, near Erfurt in Thuringia,  Germany, the son of a minister. Müller had what would be seen today as a normal scientific education at the universities of Berlin (earning a BSc in Botany) and Greifswald, culminating in a doctoral degree in Biology. He subsequently decided to study medicine. As a medical student, he began to question religion and in 1846 became an atheist, joining the Free Congregations and supporting free love. Despite completing the course, he did not graduate because he refused to swear the graduation oath, which contained the phrase "so help me God and his sacred Gospel".

Müller was disappointed by the failure of the Prussian Revolution in 1848, and realised there might be implications for his life and career. As a result, he emigrated to South Brazil in 1852, with his brother August and their wives, to join Hermann Blumenau's new colony in the State of Santa Catarina. The colony, near the coast on the Itajaí River, was called Blumenau. In Brazil, Müller, living with his wife Caroline, became a farmer, doctor, teacher and biologist, sometimes employed by the provincial government, sometimes surviving on his own efforts, sometimes defending against Indians but always collecting evidence of life in the Atlantic forest. The climate here is sub-tropical, and the vegetation typical of the Brazilian coast: it is not rain forest.

Müller gained an official teaching post, and spent a decade teaching mathematics at a college in Desterro on the island of Santa Catarina. Then the college was taken over by the Jesuits, and Müller (though retaining his salary) returned to the Itajaí River valley. He negotiated a menu of botanical activities with the provincial government and spent the next nine years doing botanical research and advising farmers.

In 1876 he was appointed as Travelling Naturalist to the National Museum in Rio de Janeiro. This was the ideal post for him: it gave him the opportunity to range over the whole of the Itajaí system and study anything that interested him. A series of reports published in the Archivos of the National Museum record this work. He was a contemporary of several other foreign naturalists who were invited to work there by the Director of the National Museum, Ladislau Netto, such as Émil Goeldi and Hermann von Ihering.

At last this, the best period of his life, was brought to an end indirectly, by the overthrow of the liberal monarchy of Dom Pedro II in 1889. The new Brazilian Republic was riddled with corruption and nepotism, and eventually there was a civil war in 1893–95. One of the mistakes made by the Republic was to withdraw support from the regions, no doubt to make sure resources went to the new rulers and their families. Travelling naturalists were to be based in Rio de Janeiro, and instructions were sent out to the regions. Müller refused point-blank and was dismissed, as was von Ihering in São Paulo.

In his retirement years Müller received many letters of support and offers of financial help (from Darwin, amongst others). His cousin Alfred Möller visited him, and eventually became his biographer. Alfred Möller was also a biologist, who researched fungi, and made a classic elucidation of the underground gardens of leaf-cutter ants.

Müller and his wife had seven daughters and a son, who died early. His wife and several of the daughters also pre-deceased him; these losses affected him more than all the practical difficulties of life in Brazil. His rewards during life from the Brazilian state were minor; but his reputation now stands high. He was one of a half-dozen great naturalists to visit and work in South America during the nineteenth century. Humboldt, Darwin, Wallace, Bates, Spruce — and Fritz Müller. He was the only one of these to settle in Brazil for the rest of his life. A statue was erected to Müller in Blumenau in 1929.

Chronology of life 
A broad chronology of Müller's life is as follows:

1822-41: Childhood and schooling, near Erfurt.
1841-49: University and medical school, mostly at Greifswald and Berlin.
1849-52: Respite in the countryside.
1852-56: Emigration with brother August and their wives; lived at and near Blumenau on the river Itajaí.
1856-67: At Desterro (the provincial capital, later Florianópolis) on the island of Santa Catarina. He was mathematics teacher at the Lycée.
1867-76: Return to the Itajaí Valley as a minor provincial official. Worked as a botanist and as an advisor to farmers.
1876-91: Travelling naturalist of the National Museum. Explored throughout the Itajaí system. Dismissed by refusing order to live in Rio de Janeiro.
1891-97: Last years; visited 1890-93 by cousin Alfred Möller.

Biology 
During his life Müller published over 70 papers, mostly in German-language periodicals, some in English and Portuguese. The topics covered a range of natural history topics:
Entomology
Termites
Hymenoptera: ants and bees
Lepidoptera: butterflies and moths
Marine zoology
Crustacea
Botany
Excursions and surveys throughout Itajaí river system. Collected seeds and specimens; exchanged seeds with Joseph Dalton Hooker at Kew Gardens and sent specimens.
Pollination in orchids
Climbing plants

Müllerian mimicry. Müller's great discovery concerned the resemblance between two or more unpalatable species which are protected from predators capable of learning. The protection is often a noxious chemical, perhaps gained from the larva eating a particular plant; or it may be a sting or other defence. It is an advantage for such potential prey to advertise their status in a way clearly perceptible to their predators; this is called aposematic or warning coloration. The principle is of wide application, but in Muller's case the prey were butterflies, and the predators usually birds or reptiles.

The aposematic colours are most often some combination of red, yellow, black, white, whereas palatable animals are usually cryptic. The noxious animals may display by slow flying, and in general are prominently visible. Noxious animals usually have thick, leathery cuticles through which, at certain points, they extrude noxious fluids when pecked; they will often survive a 'trial'.

In Müllerian mimicry an advantage is gained when unpalatable species resemble each other, especially when the predator has a good memory for colour (as birds, for instance, do have). Thus one trial may work to dissuade a bird from several species of butterfly which all fly the same 'flag'. Brazilian butterflies provide some of the most extraordinary examples of mimicry, and Müller, Bates and Wallace all had lengthy experience of this. All three traveller-naturalists believed firmly that such systems of mimicry could only come about by means of natural selection, and all of them wrote about it.

Müllerian bodies in Cecropia. Müller was able to show that the small bodies at the petiole-bases of Cecropia are food bodies and are used by protecting ants of the genus Azteca which inhabit the hollow stems of these fast growing trees.

Stingless bees. One of his favourite topics was the life habits of the stingless honey-bees Melipona and Trigona. They are protected by a venom which they squirt when disturbed. The local name for them is Cagafogo (fire-shitter).

Dimorphism in midges. Another discovery was the dimorphism in midges of the family Blephariceridae. There are two female forms with different mouth-parts: one sucks blood, the other takes nectar, as does the male. To prove the point to skeptics, he sexed the flies carefully, and reared them from pupae.

Termites. By studying living termites Müller was able to correct many errors to be found in textbooks. For example, their caste system is organised quite differently from ants, since the castes contain members of both sexes, whereas in Hymenoptera the castes are unisexual and the males are haploid. Termites are placed in a completely distinct order from ants, traditionally the Isoptera.

Botanical work. Much of Müller's botany was stimulated by the series of botanical works published by Darwin in the years after the Origin. Müller made contributions in all these fields. After Darwin's Fertilisation of Orchids (1862) he spent years of work on orchids, sending observations to his brother Hermann and to Darwin. Darwin used some of this work in his second edition of 1877, and Hermann later became famous for his work on pollination. On Climbing plants (1867) Müller lent a letter to Darwin listing 40 genera of climbing plants classified by their method of climbing. The next few months saw more observations, which Darwin had translated and published as Müller's first paper in English. As a botanist, Fritz Müller is denoted by the author abbreviation F.J.Müll. when citing a botanical name.

Müller and Darwin 
Müller became a strong supporter of Charles Darwin. He wrote Für Darwin in 1864, arguing that  Darwin's theory of evolution by natural selection was correct, and that Brazilian crustaceans and their larvae could be affected by adaptations at any growth stage. Müller sent a copy to Darwin, who had the book privately translated for his own use. A later translation into English, with some additional material by Müller, was made by W.S. Dallas, and was published as Facts and Arguments for Darwin in 1869 (Darwin sponsored the translation and publication).

Extensive correspondence exists between Müller and Darwin, and Müller also corresponded with his brother Hermann Müller, Alexander Agassiz, Ernst Krause and Ernst Haeckel.

References

Biographies 
 Alfred Möller, 1920. Fritz Müller. Werke, Briefe und Leben [virtually the sole biographical source for this significant biologist]
 Cezar Zillig, 1997. Dear Mr. Darwin. A intimidade da correspondência entre Fritz Müller e Charles Darwin. Sky/Anima Comunicação e Design, São Paulo, 241 pp. [letters between Müller and Darwin, with very interesting comments on the life of Fritz Müller. In Portuguese]
Andreas Daum, Wissenschaftspopularisierung im 19. Jahrhundert: Bürgerliche Kultur, naturwissenschaftliche Bildung und die deutsche Öffentlichkeit, 1848–1914. Munich: Oldenbourg, 1998, [contains a short biography and much information on the contemporary context, including Darwinism in Germany, Haeckel, Krause, etc.]
 David A. West, 2003. Fritz Müller: A Naturalist in Brazil. Blacksburg: Pocahontas Press.  [modern, and most welcome, though the biographical information rests almost entirely on Möller's book. West adds excellent summaries and assessments of Müller's biological work]

External links

 
 Facts and Arguments for Darwin
 
 Dr. Fritz Müller on Some Difficult Cases of Mimicry (1882)
 Fritz Müller on mimicry
 Review of West's biography (pdf file)
 Another review of West's biography, and a different photo of Müller

Botanists with author abbreviations
19th-century German biologists
Humboldt University of Berlin alumni
University of Greifswald alumni
German entomologists
Hymenopterists
Brazilian biologists
Evolutionary biologists
German atheists
Brazilian atheists
German emigrants to Brazil
1822 births
1897 deaths
People from Blumenau
Natural history of Brazil
Free love advocates
Expatriate academics in Brazil